Manuel Llano Ríos (died 18 November 1931) was a Mexican tennis player.

A two-time medalist at the Central American and Caribbean Games, Llano was an occasional Davis Cup player for Mexico. During his Davis Cup career he featured in a total of five rubbers across four ties between 1924 and 1931. He competed in the main draw of the U.S. National Championships while touring in the 1920s.

Llano died on 18 November 1931, of injuries sustained days earlier when he shot himself in the chest with a rifle. At the time of his suicide he was the second highest ranked Mexican player on tour. It was reported that he had been suffering from an illness that he feared would prevent him from being able to play tennis.

See also
List of Mexico Davis Cup team representatives

References

External links
 
 
 

1931 suicides
Mexican male tennis players
Central American and Caribbean Games medalists in tennis
Central American and Caribbean Games silver medalists for Mexico
Central American and Caribbean Games bronze medalists for Mexico
Competitors at the 1926 Central American and Caribbean Games
Competitors at the 1930 Central American and Caribbean Games
Suicides by firearm in Mexico
1897 births
20th-century Mexican people